Harold Percival Norton (November 4, 1855 – February 11, 1933) was a rear admiral in the United States Navy.

Biography
Norton was born on November 4, 1855, in New York. He married Mary Barbour in 1911. Norton died on February 11, 1933, in Washington, D.C., and is buried with Barbour at Arlington National Cemetery.

Career
Norton was appointed a cadet engineer in 1874. He would go on to serve in England and the Republic of China, as well as aboard the USS Swatara (1873) and the USS Albany (CL-23).

References

People from New York (state)
United States Navy admirals
1855 births
1933 deaths
Burials at Arlington National Cemetery